Appledore is a small village near Uffculme in Devon, England, about 7 miles (11 kilometres) east of Tiverton.

Appledore was listed in the Domesday Book of 1086.

References

External links
 
 

Villages in Mid Devon District